Starchiojd is a commune in Prahova County, Muntenia, Romania. It is composed of six villages: Brădet, Gresia, Rotarea, Starchiojd, Valea Anei and Zmeuret.

Notes

Starchiojd
Localities in Muntenia